The Battle of Ist was a naval engagement in Adriatic Sea, between the islands of Škarda and Molat, off the island of Ist, on 29 February 1944. The engagement was fought between two Free French Naval Forces destroyers and a Kriegsmarine force of two corvettes, two torpedo boats and three minesweepers. The German flotilla had been deployed to escort a freighter. In the ensuing engagement the French managed to destroy the German freighter and a corvette in return for no loss before withdrawing.

Background
The French under Captain Pierre Lancelot would operate in the northern part of the Adriatic, while the British would do the same but further south. The speed of the French destroyers, being the fastest in the world at the time, allowed them to react swiftly both on intelligence and to strike at targets.

Action
On 29 February the French departed Manfredonia fifty miles North of Bari and headed up the Adriatic. They were escorting the  freighter Kapitan Diederichsen. The German escorts had only been recently commissioned and were only on their second operation. The two were heading towards each other in the dark of the night with very little moonlight.

At 21:35 hours Le Terribles radar soon picked up targets further north and sailed towards them. When it was known that the targets were confirmed as non-allied, the French opened fire at roughly 9,000 yards just west of Ist Island, surprising the Germans. Le Malin opened fire on the largest of the targets which was the freighter and soon scored a hit. The Germans attempted to lay a smoke screen, but the destroyers with their speed soon closed in using their radar. Le Terrible scored more hits on the freighter while Le Malin targeted the closest of the escorts. At  Le Terrible fired a salvo of torpedoes; the first salvo missed but the first device of the second salvo hit the freighter amidships which then caused her to burn fiercely and she soon drifted helplessly.

Meanwhile, UJ201 was soon struck by Le Malin'''s well-directed  shells; now having found the range, the German corvette was hit six more times and was soon a burning wreck. Le Malin was close enough to launch a salvo of torpedoes; one hit and was enough to detonate the ship's magazine causing a tremendous explosion lighting up the sky. She sank immediately and all hands went with her.  Both Le Terrible and Le Malin then took on the rest of the German escorts; TA36 suffered near misses and was soon hit right on the end of the bow suffering light damage. TA37 however was hit in the engine room and burst into flames which caused her speed to drop rapidly.

Lancelot was about to finish off the German ship, but on seeing low fast-moving silhouettes of potential E-boats he decided to withdraw. They were in fact the motor minesweepers coming in to help with the crew of the stricken freighter and search for survivors of the destroyed UJ201. Lancelot headed south back to port.

Aftermath
The Kapitan Diederichsen remained afloat but only for some time, an attempt to tow failed and the survivors were taken off by the German escorts. The heavily damaged TA37 was towed successfully and made it to Pola.

The French forced remained in the Adriatic for  half of the year bombarding Zante, and on 19 March sank two Siebel ferries SF273 and SF274'' on their way to Pylos and crippling another two. In August they took part in Operation Dragoon, the Southern Invasion of France.

References

Citations

Bibliography
 

 

Ist
Ist
Ist
Adriatic Sea
Ist
1944 in Croatia
February 1944 events